Przedborowa  is a village in the administrative district of Gmina Stoszowice, within Ząbkowice Śląskie County, Lower Silesian Voivodeship, in south-western Poland. Prior to 1945 it was in Germany.

Notable people
 Jan Jankiewicz, Polish cyclist

References

 

Villages in Ząbkowice Śląskie County